The Christian Protestant Angkola Church is a Lutheran denomination in Indonesia. It is a member of the Lutheran World Federation, which it joined in 1977. It is affiliated with the Christian Conference of Asia, the Communion of Churches in Indonesia, and the World Council of Churches.

External links 
Lutheran World Federation listing

Lutheran denominations
Lutheran organizations
Indonesia
Lutheran World Federation members